David Hammons (May 12, 1808 – November 7, 1888) was a United States representative from Maine.

He was born in Cornish, Massachusetts (now in Maine) on May 12, 1808.  He attended the common schools and Limerick Academy in Limerick, Maine.  He studied law with David Gould in Alfred, Maine, was admitted to the bar  and commenced practice in Lovell.

He was elected a member of the Maine State Senate (1840–1841).

In 1846 Hammons was elected to the U.S. House as a Democrat, and served in the Thirtieth Congress (March 4, 1847 – March 3, 1849).

After leaving Congress Hammons continued the practice of law.  Though he had been willing to support the expansion of slavery in order to prevent southern states from seceding, he supported the Union during the American Civil War, and worked for no fee to aid Union Army veterans who filed claims for disability pensions.

Hammons died in Bethel on November 7, 1888.  His interment was in Woodland Cemetery.

References

1808 births
1888 deaths
People from Lovell, Maine
Democratic Party Maine state senators
Democratic Party members of the United States House of Representatives from Maine
People from Cornish, Maine
19th-century American politicians